This is a list of the National Register of Historic Places listings in Walker County, Texas.

This is intended to be a complete list of properties listed on the National Register of Historic Places in Walker County, Texas. There are five properties listed on the National Register in the county. One property is a State Antiquities Landmark (SAL) and a Recorded Texas Historic Landmark (RTHL), and another property is also a SAL while containing within it an additional SAL and two RTHLs.

Current listings

The locations of National Register properties may be seen in a mapping service provided.

|}

See also

National Register of Historic Places listings in Texas
Recorded Texas Historic Landmarks in Walker County

References

External links

Walker County, Texas
Walker County
Buildings and structures in Walker County, Texas